Elections in Assam are conducted since 1952 to elect the members of Assam Legislative Assembly and for the members of Lok Sabha. There are 126 assembly constituencies and 14 Lok Sabha constituencies. Next Assam Assembly Elections are due in 2026.

Legislative Assembly elections
The elections for the Assam Legislative Assembly held since 1952.

Lok Sabha Elections

References